Kargil is a 2018 Indian Tamil-language romantic drama film directed by Sivaani Senthil and starring Jishnu Menon in the lead role. The film is one of the only Tamil-language films that features one character throughout the film.

Plot 
Kargil is a war not between two countries but between two hearts. Arjun (Jishnu Menon) an IT Professional romances with his lover girl Maha who fights more which Arjun treats as his Love. Maha informs about her Dad who travels from US next week and ask Arjun to receive him, impress him and get permission for marriage. Arjun accept that with a smile and says he will marry Maha immediately as Tatkal marriage once his Dad arrives.

On the day, Arjun travels alone from Chennai to Bangalore in his car without receiving Dad and Maha as usual get angry with him and disconnect the mobile.

Throughout the movie hero travels alone in his car and speaks in the speakerphone with all the other characters.

Along with Maha, the trouble arises from Sindhu, his Ex-Lover and current MD, boss Kings, Missed call Beep Sahayam, Inspector Vincent, US return Aadhi. 

Arjun resolves his problems believe in his love and states MY TRUST IS MY LOVE and finally impresses Dad and convince Maha

Cast 
Jishnu Menon as Arjun 

Voice cast

Prarna Sathani as Maha
Iswarya as Sindu
Akan Jayabalan as Senthil Maams
Nivin Sahaya as Sahayam
Kartikeyan as Vincent
Sivaani Senthil as Kings
Meiyappan as Sathyan
Harish as Aadhi
Abinath as Pandi
Renuka as Nancy

Production 
The film stars one person for much of the film and bears no relationship to the Kargil war. Other than a brief scene involving the heroine, the rest of the film features one character who is travelling a car.
 
The film was made on a low budget with new faces in a small schedule but failed to reach the audience due to little promotional activity.

Release 
Deccan Chronicle gave the film a rating of two out of five stars and noted that "After a point, the film becomes monotonous. Shivaani’s idea is laudable, but had he concentrated on infusing few more interesting elements, it would have made the right impact". The Times of India gave the film the same rating and stated "Kudos to Sivaani for choosing an interesting concept to debut with, but he should really have spent some more time in fine-tuning the script". Cinema Express gave the film a rating of one out of five stars and wrote that "The only saving grace comes in the form of the humour portions involving a wrong call from someone named Beep Sagayam".

References

External links 

2018 films
2010s Tamil-language films
Indian romantic drama films
One-character films
2018 romantic drama films